No less than 21 ships of the French Navy have borne the name Favorite (Favourite). Among them:

  (1810–1811), a 44-gun frigate destroyed at the Battle of Lissa
 , an  launched in 1938. Seized by Germany in 1940 and renamed UF-2 she was scuttled in 1945

French Navy ship names